The large vlei rat (Otomys maximus) is a species of rodent in the family Muridae.
It is found in Angola, Botswana, Democratic Republic of the Congo, Namibia, and Zambia.
Its natural habitats are moist savanna, subtropical or tropical seasonally wet or flooded lowland grassland, and swamps.

References

 Taylor, P. 2004.  Otomys maximus.   2006 IUCN Red List of Threatened Species.   Downloaded on 19 July 2007.

Otomys
Mammals described in 1924
Taxonomy articles created by Polbot